Yubileyny is a rural locality (a settlement) in Yubileyny Selsoviet of Zeysky District, Amur Oblast, Russia. The population was 432 as of 2018. There are 7 streets.

Geography 
Yubileyny is located on the left bank of the Zeya River, 103 km south of Zeya (the district's administrative centre) by road. Rublevka is the nearest rural locality.

References 

Rural localities in Zeysky District